Robert John Murray (born July 16, 1948) is a Canadian former professional ice hockey defenceman. He played 194 games for the Atlanta Flames and Vancouver Canucks of the National Hockey League between 1973 and 1977. Prior to turning professional Murray played for Michigan Tech, and also spent time in the minor American Hockey League and Central Hockey League.

Early life
Murray was born in Peterborough, Ontario. After playing four seasons at Michigan Tech, where he was named a WCHA First All-Star and NCAA West First All-American in 1971, Murray was signed as a territorial exemption by the Montreal Canadiens in September 1971.

Career 
Murray played two seasons in the AHL for the Nova Scotia Voyageurs, the Canadiens' affiliate. Prior to the 1973–74 NHL season he was traded for a third-round draft pick to the Atlanta Flames, where he played one and a half seasons before being traded again to the Vancouver Canucks for Gerry Meehan, March 9, 1975.

He played 194 NHL games with the Flames and Canucks. After the 1976–77 season he began playing in Germany, where he would play another 11 years of professional hockey.

Personal life
His younger brother, Jim Murray, was selected by the New York Islanders in the 16th round (226th overall) of the 1974 NHL amateur draft, but never played in the NHL.

Career statistics

Regular season and playoffs

Awards and honors

References

External links

1948 births
Living people
AHCA Division I men's ice hockey All-Americans
Atlanta Flames players
Canadian ice hockey defencemen
Sportspeople from Peterborough, Ontario
Nova Scotia Voyageurs players
Peterborough Petes (ice hockey) players
Tulsa Oilers (1964–1984) players
Vancouver Canucks players
Ice hockey people from Ontario
Canadian expatriate ice hockey players in the United States